Pantusovo is a rural locality (a village) in Nizhneshardengskoye Rural Settlement, Velikoustyugsky District, Vologda Oblast, Russia. The population was 2 as of 2002.

Geography 
Pantusovo is located 41 km south of Veliky Ustyug (the district's administrative centre) by road. Isakovo is the nearest rural locality.

References 

Rural localities in Velikoustyugsky District